Zenon Kasztelan (born 16 November 1946) is a Polish footballer. He played in six matches for the Poland national football team in 1973.

References

External links
 

1946 births
Living people
Polish footballers
Poland international footballers
Place of birth missing (living people)
Association footballers not categorized by position